The wood-pasture hypothesis (also known as the Vera hypothesis and the megaherbivore theory) is a scientific hypothesis positing that open and semi-open pastures and wood-pastures formed the predominant type of landscape in post-glacial Europe, rather than the common belief of primeval forests. The hypothesis proposes that such a landscape would be formed and maintained by large wild herbivores. Although others, including Oliver Rackham, who criticised the idea of an all-encompassing, dark primeval forest in pre-neolithic Europe, had previously expressed similar ideas, it was Dutch researcher Frans Vera, who, in his 2000 book Grazing Ecology and Forest History, first developed a comprehensive framework for such ideas and formulated them into a theorem. Vera's proposals, although highly controversial, came at a time when the role grazers played in woodlands was increasingly being reconsidered, and are credited for ushering in a period of increased reassesment and interdisciplinary research in European conservation theory and practice. Although Vera largely focused his research on the European situation, his findings could also be applied to other temperate ecological regions worldwide, especially the broadleaved ones.

Vera's ideas have met with both rejection and approval in the scientific community, and continue to lay an important foundation for the rewilding-movement. While his proposals for widespread semi-open savanna as the predominant landscape of temperate Europe in the early to mid-Holocene have at large been rejected, they do partially agree with the established wisdom about vegetation structure during previous interglacials.  Moreover, modern research has shown that, under the current climate, free-roaming large grazers can indeed influence and even temporarily halt vegetation succession. It has also been questioned whether the Holocene prior to the rise of agriculture provides an adequate approximation to a state of "pristine nature" at all, since by that time anatomically modern humans had already been omnipresent in Europe for millennia, with in all likelihood profound effects on the environment.

The severe loss of megafauna at the end of the Pleistocene and beginning of the Holocene known as the Quaternary extinction event, which is frequently linked to human activities, did not leave Europe unscathed and brought about a profound change in the European large mammal assemblage and thus ecosystems as a whole, which probably also affected vegetation patterns. The assumption, however, that the pre-Neolithic represents pristine conditions is a prerequisite for both the "high-forest theory" and the Vera hypothesis in their respective original forms. Whether or not the hypothesis is supported may thus further depend on whether or not the pre-Neolithic Holocene is accepted as a baseline for pristine nature, and thus also on whether the Quaternary extinction of megafauna is considered (primarily) natural or man-made.

Names and definitions 
Vera's hypothesis goes by many names, since Vera himself did not provide a distinguished name for it. Instead, he simply referred to it as the alternative hypothesis, alternative to the high-forest theory, which he called the null hypothesis. Therefore, over the years, his hypothesis was called a great many of names, including the wood-pasture hypothesis, the wooded pasture hypothesis, the Vera hypothesis and the temperate savanna hypothesis. Especially in Continental Europe, it is commonly known as the megaherbivore hypothesis and literal translations thereof.

As defined by Vera the general area his ideas refer to covers Western and Central Europe between 45°N and 58°N latitude and 5°W and 25°W longitude. This includes most of the British Isles and everything between France and Poland and Southern Scandinavia to the Alps. Furthermore, he confined it to altitudes below . By extension, the North American East Coast is also addressed as an analogy with a comparable climate.

High-forest theory 

Contrary to Vera's ideas, the high-forest theory is the established and widely accepted view that the post-glacial history of vegetation in temperate Europe (and by extension the temperate hemisphere) is one of more or less dense closed-canopy forest. This school of thought was founded by Heinrich Cotta with his 1817 work Anweisungen zum Waldbau (Directions for Silviculture), in which he posits that if humans abandoned his native Germany, in the space of 100 years it would be "covered with wood".

Later, this position was accompanied by Clements' formulation of the theory of linear succession, meaning that under the right conditions bare ground would, over time, invariably become colonised by a succession of plant communities eventually leading to closed stands dominated by the tallest plant species. Because in most of the temperate hemisphere, the potentially tallest plants are trees, the final product would therefore chiefly be forest. Albeit with changes in conceptualisation and some modifications, this concept remains the one favoured by most, providing the conceptual framework for many forest-related methods and customs in forestry and conservation, including the  doctrine advocated by German forest-ecologist Knut Sturm, which highlights the importance of non-intervention and space of time for forest protection, as it is implemented in forest reserves such as Białowieża. Although Clements' notion of stable climax communities was later challenged and refined by authorities such as Arthur Tansley, Alexander Watt and Robert Whittaker, who championed the inclusion of dynamic processes, like temporary collapse of canopy cover because of windthrow, fire or calamities, into Clements' framework, this did not change anything about the status of the "high-forest theory" as the commonly accepted view; that without human intervention closed-canopy forest would dominate the global temperate regions as the potential natural vegetation. This is also the concept that was advocated by European plant experts like Heinz Ellenberg, Johannes Iversen and Franz Firbas.

Apart from theoretical considerations, this concept has relied and continues to rely heavily on both field observations and, more recently, on findings from pollen analysis, which allow inferences about the vegetation structure of past epochs based on the ratio of for instance tree pollen to pollen associated with grassland and is the most widely used means of generating historic vegetation data. The analysis of pollen data has provided a solid database from which a predominance of forest throughout the early stages of the Holocene of temperate Europe, especially the Atlantic, is generally inferred, although the possibility of regional differences remains open. On that basis, the history of vegetation in Europe is generally reconstructed as a history of forest.

Large herbivores in relation to the high-forest theory 

There is no general agreement on herbivores and their influence on succession in natural ecosystems in the temperate hemisphere. In the high-forest theory framework, wild herbivores were mostly considered as minor factors, derived from the assumption that the natural vegetation was forest. Therefore, wild herbivores were characterised by Tansley as followers of succession, not as actively influencing it, because otherwise Europe would not have been forested. From this assumption the principle was proposed that the natural abundance of herbivores did not hinder forest succession, which meant that herbivore numbers would necessarily be considered too high as soon as they prevent the natural regeneration of the forest. In line with this notion, WWF Russia considers five to seven animals the optimal density of bison per 1000 ha, because if the population exceeds 13 animals per 1000 ha, first signs of vegetation suppression are observed. Similarly, it is widely believed that two to seven deer per  is a sustainable number based on the assumption that if deer numbers exceed this bar, they start having a negative impact on woodland regeneration. Consequently, culling is commonly deemed an adequate measure to reduce a perceived overabundance of deer to sustainable levels and mimic natural predation.

Still, the conjecture that herbivore numbers are naturally controlled substantially by predators, and consequently that human hunting can mimic this effect, is not entirely supported by scientific analyses of natural predator-prey dynamics, and probably depends on other factors. Another, perhaps more important influence predators may have on prey animals may be the landscape of fear their presence can create, promoting landscape heterogeneity. Overall, the factors regulating large ungulate populations are still subject to debate, and food availibility is generally considered an important constraint, even in the presence of large predators. 

In juxtaposition, herbivore biomass exceeds approximations commonly deemed appropriate for temperate forests by a multiple both in regions with relatively intact large-mammal assemblages in Africa and Asia and in European rewilding areas where "naturalistic grazing" is practised. Hence, it has been suggested that the comparatively high forest cover of the pre-Neolithic European Holocene may be a consequence of megaherbivore extinctions during the Quaternary extinction event, as compared to the last interglacial in Europe with a pristine megafauna, the Eemian, the early stages of the Holocene appear to have been much more forested, which according to the authors is unlikely to be the result of the latter's only slightly cooler climate compared to the Eemian. However, this is also subject to debate.

Background: Grazers and browsers 
A fundamental factor that influences the way in which large herbivores exercise an influence on the landscape level is related to differences in feeding strategies. Namely, browsers like roe deer, elk and the black rhino focus on woody vegetation, while the diet of grazers like horse, cattle and the white rhino is dominated by grasses and forbs. Intermediate feeders, like the wisent and the red deer, fall in between. Generally, grazers tend to be more social, less selective in their food choices and forage more intensively. Therefore, their impact on vegetation composition tends to be higher, as well as their ability to maintain open spaces.

Thus, it is relevant for Vera's hypothesis that of all the remaining large wild herbivores historically native to temperate European lowlands – roe deer, red deer, elk, wild boar, wisent and beaver – none is an obligate grazer, while the only two obligate large wild grazers left in Europe after the end of the Pleistocene, aurochs and wild horse, are now both extinct, and their domesticated descendants, cattle and horse, are now largely kept in stables and close to settlements, making them effectively extinct in the landscape. Backbreeding-projects, such as the German Taurus project and the Dutch Tauros programme are addressing this issue by breeding domestic cattle that can be released into the landscape as hardy and sufficiently similar proxies to act as ecological replacements for the aurochs. Similarly, primitive horse breeds such as the Konik, Exmoor pony and the Sorraia are being used as proxies for the tarpan.

Vera's alternative hypothesis

Vera's hypothesis, in contrast to the high-forest theory, holds that although the warming climate of the onsetting Holocene in Europe provided conditions that would allow for the formation of a closed-canopy forest, wild herbivores kept vast areas in temperate Europe relatively open, park-like. During the Holocene, these herbivores included aurochs, European bison, red deer and tarpan. Up to the Quaternary extinctions, many other megafaunal mammals like the straight-tusked elephant or Merck's rhinoceros existed in Europe as well, and may have kept the forests open during warm interglacial periods like the Eemian interglacial. Furthermore, Vera postulated that lowland forest did not emerge on a large scale before the onset of the Neolithic period and subsequent local extinctions of herbivores, which in turn allowed forests to thrive more unhindered. Indeed, investigations point to at least locally open circumstances, for example in floodplains, on infertile soils, chalklands and in submediterranean and continental areas, but maintain that forest largely dominated.

However, the wood-pasture hypothesis is to some degree based on the Quaternary extinction event, which started around 130,000 years ago but reached a maximum extinction rate from 13,000 to 8000 years ago, around the Pleistocene-Holocene boundary, and includes the woolly mammoth as a popular victim. While this extinction event affected many groups of primarily land animals, large animals above 45 kg (99.20 lb) and especially megafaunal animals above 1000 kg (2.200 lb) were affected most severely; the latter group vanished completely from the northern hemisphere, Latin America and Australasia. Besides these regions, extinctions were also centered on the Pacific islands, Madagascar and the Caribbean, while Indomalaya and Sub-Saharan Africa were proportionally less affected.

Moreover in his book Vera also discusses the decline of ancient oak-hickory-forest communities in Eastern North America. For long it was noted that many forests stemming from Pre-Columbian times feature light-demanding oaks and hickories prominently, but that these do not readily regenerate in modern forests; a phenomenon commonly referred to as oak regeneration failure. Instead, shade-tolerant species such as red maple and American beech often prevail. While the cause is still poorly understood, a lack of natural fire is commonly presumed to play a role. Vera, however, suggested that the grazing and browsing of wild herbivores, most importantly American bison, would have created the conditions oaks and hickories need for successful regeneration to happen, and explained the modern lack of regeneration of these species in forests with the mass-slaughter of bisons committed by European settlers.

The wood-pasture hypothesis builds in part on the overkill-hypothesis, which holds that human hunting was the dominant factor for the Quaternary extinction event. The overkill-hypothesis, outlined by Paul S. Martin in 1966, with related models coming later, overall favours a human cause for the evidently massive ecological shifts of the Quaternary extinction era. Martin's overkill-hypothesis opposed the climate change hypothesis, which attributes the extinctions solely or mostly to changes in climate. Thus, the hypothesis suggests that human exploitation led to the megafauna extinctions, resulting in vacant ecological niches (previously dependent on the presence of megafauna), ultimately leading to a surge in forest vegetation.

Paleoecological evidence drawn from Coleoptera deposits has also shown that, albeit rare, beetle species associated with grasslands and other open landscapes were present throughout the Holocene in Western Europe, which points to open habitats being present, but restricted. However, insect assemblages from previous interglacials when the larger megafauna was still present indicate widespread warm temperate savannah, pointing to the possibility that elephants and rhinos were more effective creators of open landscapes than the herbivores left after the Quaternary extinction event. On the other hand, traditional animal husbandry might have mitigated the effects of possibly human-induced megafaunal die-off, and thus enabled the survival of an array of species associated with or dependent on landscapes created and maintained by megafauna.

Main arguments

Oak and hazel 

Vera relies on several lines of argument based on experiments, ecology, evolutionary ecology, palynology, history and etymology. One of the most elementary arguments put forward to substantiate the hypothesis is of an ecological nature; the widespread lack of successful regeneration of light-demanding tree species in modern forests, especially the lack of regeneration of pedunculate oak, sessile oak (together hereafter addressed as "oak") and common hazel in Europe. This reality is starkly contrasted by European pollen deposits from previous ages, with oak and hazel often forming a dominant amount of pollen, making a dominance of these species in previous ages conceivable. Especially in regard to hazel, sufficient flowering is only achieved when enough sunlight is available, i.e. the plant grows outside of a closed canopy. Thus it is argued, that the high abundance of pollen of the two taxa Quercus and Corylus in previous ages can only be explained by the primeval landscape having been of a more open nature, and this contrast forms the principal theorem of Vera's hypothesis. Further, it has been suggested that oak requires disturbances for successful establishment.

However, pollen records from islands that lacked many of the large grazers and browsers that, according to Vera, were essential for the maintenance of landscapes with an open character in temperate Europe show almost no differences in comparison to mainland Europe. More specifically pollen records from Holocene Ireland, which during the early Holocene was apparently, owing to a lack of fossils, devoid of any big herbivores except for abundant wild boar and rare red deer, show almost equally high percentages of pollen of the two taxa. Thus, one could conclude, that large herbivores were not a required factor for the degree of openness in a landscape, and the abundance of pollen from species unable to reproduce and regenerate sufficiently under a closed canopy, e.g. hazel and oak could only be explained by other factors like windthrow and natural fires.

Vera's notion may be supported by observations over the course of 20 years forest regeneration in forest gaps created by windthrow, which showed that hornbeam and beech dominate the emerging stands and largely displace oaks on fertile, nutrient-rich soil. However, after the last Ice Age oak returned earlier to Central and Western Europe than beech or hornbeam, which may have contributed to its commonness, at least during the early Holocene. Still, other shade-tolerant tree species like lime and elm were equally fast returnees, and do not seem to have limited oak abundance.

On the other hand, substantial natural oak-regeneration commonly takes place outside of forests in fringe and transitional habitats, suggesting that a focus on regeneration in forests in an attempt to explain oak regeneration failure might be insufficient in regard to the ecology of Central European oak species. Rather, an underestimated reason for widespread failure of oak regeneration may be found in the direct effects of land-use changes since the early modern period, which has led to a more simplistic, homogenous landscape, as spontaneous regeneration of both oak and hazel does frequently occur in margins, thickets, and low-grazing-intensity or abandoned pasture/arable land.

Furthermore, new species of oak mildew (Erysiphe alphitoides) observed on European oaks for the first time at the beginning of the 20th century have been cited as a possible reason for these differences, since they affect the shade tolerance, particularly of young pedunculate and sessile oaks. Although the origin of these new oak pathogens remains obscure, studies point to it being an invasive species from the tropics, possibly being conspecific with a pathogen found on mangos

Other European light-demanding woody species 
Vera prominently argues that since other light-demanding and often thorny woody species exist in Europe—species such as common hawthorn, midland hawthorn, blackthorn, Crataegus rhipidophylla, wild pear and crab apple—their ecology can only be explained under the influence of large herbivores, and that in the absence of these they represent an anachronism.

Underrepresentation of grasses and insect-pollinated plants in pollen deposits 
Vera further contests that pollen diagrams can adequately display past species occurrences, since, inherently, pollen deposits tend to overrepresent species that are wind-pollinated and notoriously underrepresent species that are pollinated by insects. Furthermore, he proposed that an absence of grass pollen in pollen diagrams can be explained by high grazing pressure, which would prevent the grasses from flowering, and claims that under such conditions, open environments with scattered mature trees may appear as closed forests in pollen deposits. He consequently proposes that the conspicuous scarcity of grass pollen in pollen deposits dating from the pre-Neolithic Holocene might not necessarily speak against the existence of open environments dominated by grasses. However, it is generally considered that over 60% tree pollen in pollen deposits indicates a closed forest canopy, which is true for the vast majority of European early to mid-Holocene deposits. Sites with less than 50% arboreal pollen, on the other hand, are consistently associated with human activities.

Large herbivores as overlooked drivers of vegetation patterns 
Vera stresses that the prevailing high-forest theory was born out of observations of spontaneous regeneration in the absence of grazing animals. He argues, that the presupposition that these animals do not exert a significant influence on natural regeneration and thus on the vegetation structure as a whole was assumed without comparative confirmation, and as such is a circular argument. Indeed, modern forestry and modern forest theory arose largely in the modern era and went hand in hand with the ongoing inclosure of common land throughout Europe. A consequence thereof was in many cases a ban of livestock from the forests, which had previously been largely open woodland pastures, often dominated by oaks, which were multifunctional and used for a range of purposes ranging from pannage and livestock grazing to the harvest of tree hay, coppice, timber and oak galls for the manufacture of ink, as well as for the production of charcoal, crops and fruit. This former usage of forests is often still revealed by a big age gap between tree generations, particularly if the oldest trees are mainly oaks, and many Central European forest reserves originated as common wood-pastures.

Shifted baselines 

In nature conservation, a shifted baseline is a baseline for conservation targets and desired population sizes, that is based on non-pristine conditions. In this sense, the term was coined by marine biologist Daniel Pauly when he observed, that some fisheries scientists used the population sizes of fish at the beginning of their own careers to assess a desired baseline, notwithstanding whether the fishing stocks they used as baselines had already been diminished by human exploitation. He noticed, that the estimations these scientists took for reference markedly differed from historical accounts. Consequently, he concluded, that over generations the perception of what is considered to be normal would change, and so may what is considered a depleted population. Pauly called this the shifting baseline syndrome.In line with this, it may be argued that the prevalance of closed-canopy forest as the prevailing conservation narrative in Europe similarly arises from multiple shifted baselines:

 While it is plausble that lions, leopards, hyenas, dholes, gazelles and moon bears among other victims of European Quaternary and Holocene extinctions would still be native to Europe, had they not been evicted by humans, none of these species are listed as such in the EU's Habitats Directive's annexes. This absence in conservation law, if applied also to globally extinct megafauna, would imply that elephants and rhinos should be considered native to Europe, too, and hence any landscape that is considered to be natural, yet results from a situation where these are lacking, would necessarily be the consequence of a shifted baseline. It is very likely, that the megafauna extinctions of the late Pleistocene and early Holocene had profound implications for European and worldwide ecosystems, especially given the paramount importance comparable animals have for modern ecosystems.

 Vera points out that words like wold and forest would have had different connotations than they do today. While today, a forest is a dense and reasonably large tract of trees, the Medieval Latin forestis, from which it derives, would have assigned open stands of trees, and was a wild and uncultivated land home also to aurochs and wild horses. According to historical sources, these forestis included hawthorn, blackthorn, wild cherry, wild apple and wild pear, as well as oaks, all of which are light-demanding species that cannot regenerate successfully in closed-canopy forest. From this Vera concluded that the assumption by scholars of the 19th and 20th century that grazing animals destroyed the original European closed-canopy wildwoods still present in the early medieval period is based on a misinterpretation of these terms and is closely related to the severe overstocking characteristic of their own time, which in turn would have been a consequence of population growth following the industrial revolution.

 He further argues that from this initial misinterpretation another misinterpretation arose: that forest regeneration would naturally take place inside the forest. Thus, scholars of the 19th and 20th century would have interpreted medieval grazing regulations to allow tree regeneration in coppiced mantle and fringe vegetation as meant to allow for regeneration in a forest. During their time, solid firewood would have been preferred over the medieval coppice bundles, e.g. faggots. However, the production of firewood would have required the felling of trees at an age at which they cannot produce suckers anymore, an ability trees commonly lose with progressing age. This would then have led to a different management system: the replacement by saplings planted or naturally regenerated via, for example, shelterwood cuttings. Initially these trees regenerated inside the forests would have been differentiated from wild growth outside the forests. In German, the former would have been referred to as natural regeneration (Naturverjüngung) while the latter had another name: Holzwildwuchse. Thus, natural regeneration would not have been synonymous with the natural regeneration of trees in a natural situation. Only in the 19th and 20th centuries would this distinction have been abandoned in German. However, in the absence of thorny nurse bushes, which would have disappeared due to the shadow under the trees, the planted trees would then have had to be manually protected. Therefore, the "natural regeneration" would still have depended on work like ploughing, removal of browsing pressure and the suppression of weeds and thus was and is not "natural" in the ordinary sense of the word. Instead, according to Vera, the original meaning of the word "natural" in this context was that a seed had fallen from a tree and then grown by itself, as opposed to being planted. This shifted baseline of where regeneration of trees was to be expected, shifting from thorny fringes of groves in wood-pastures to the interior of closed tree stands, would then have led to the notion of herbivores being considered detrimental for forest regeneration and would have necessitated fenced-out areas, tree shelters and population control via hunting.
 Also because of this shifted baseline, cattle and horses would now have been considered "alien" to the landscape akin to invasive species and consequently removed from the forests, as it happened in former wood-pastures like Białowieża and other modern forest reserves, because they were seen as harmful to the creation of a new old-growth forest. At the same time, the introduction of the potato would have made pannage, the fattening of pigs on acorns, obsolete, and grass species specifically bred for a high yield would have superseded the traditional pasturing, mostly of cattle, in wood-pastures. Together, these mechanisms would have created the spatial separation between livestock rearing and forestry, grassland and forest enshrined into modern law and practice.
 Finally, the biodiversity losses associated with the conversion of open grassland, mantle and fringe vegetation and open-grown trees into closed-canopy forests would then have been legitimised by the assumption that the forest was the only natural ecosystem, and hence species losses were casualties of a natural cause.
However, a strong argument that may put Vera's etymological evidence into perspective altogether is that the composition of medieval woodlands may not be relevant to their naturalness. Since by the medieval period agricultural traditions had already been ubiquitous in most of Europe for millennia, it may be unrealistic to assume that what people of the time perceived and labelled as wilderness may indeed have been one. Instead, it is doubtful that pristine conditions had survived in the Central- and Western European lowlands, Vera's area of study, at any rate up to this point.

Criticism 
Vera's ideas have been called a "challenge to orthodox thinking" and sparked much debate about the character of historic and prehistoric landscapes in Europe. However, testing using pollen data generally does not support Vera's claims for widespread semi-open savanna during early stages of the Holocene, but rather lends support to the competing and more widely accepted high-forest theory. Similarly, modelling approaches and the use of beetle diversity as an indicator for landscape openess also support the view of a predominance of forest throughout the early and middle Holocene in most of Europe. Consequently, Birks has argued for the rejection of the wood-pasture hypothesis, while acknowledging that the role grazing animals played in forest composition is being reevaluated, and has formerly been largely ignored by Quaternary paleoecologists.

On the other hand, there is consensus building that a more nuanced view of the original high-forest theory may more accurately represent primeval conditions, and that while forest did most likely dominate throughout the early stages of the Holocene, it was never as dense and overarching as previously assumed. Furthermore, the degree of forest cover would have varied considerably between regions, and would have been comparably high in Central Europe and lower in the Atlantic regions. Besides climate, topography would have probably also played a significant role. The aurochs at least seems to have favoured fertile, low-lying riverine areas and plains, which may have led to locally open conditions, while the hill and mountain ranges were more heavily forested. Overall, dense closed-canopy forest would have probably covered no more than 60% of most areas, with the remainder divided between open woodlands, savannas and open areas. This would have made the early to mid-Holocene Europe more forested than either today or during earlier interglacials, but not a continuous woodland.

Others have highlighted the importance of disturbance factors other than herbivory, particularly fire, to prehistoric landscapes, pointing out that both the high-forest theory and Vera's model have largely ignored this possibility. This stands in connection to the discovery of fire-loving beetle species and charcoal deposits in the European pre-Neolithic Holocene. It has also been argued that it may be possible to acknowledge that herbivores could have influenced the natural landscape without necessarily creating the open, park-like landscapes described by Vera.

The baseline: Quaternary glacial cycles and the Quaternary extinction event

Although Vera himself limitted his argument to the Holocene and the Fauna present into historical times, research better supports his claims in regard to earlier interglacials. Thus, it is important for the hypothesis that during the Pleistocene epoch warm periods and colder glacial periods alternated periodically and globally. In Middle to Late Pleistocene Europe, the result of this cycling was that two very different faunal and floral assemblages took turns in Central Europe. The warm-temperate Palaeoloxodon-faunal assemblage, consisting of the straight-tusked elephant, Merck's rhinoceros, the narrow-nosed rhinoceros, Hippopotamuses, European water buffalo, aurochs, and several species of deer, among others (including most of today's European fauna), had its core area in the Mediterranean. The warm-temperate assemblage periodically expanded from there into the rest of Europe during warm interglacials, and receded during glacial periods into refugia in the Mediterranean. Meanwhile, the cold-temperate faunal assemblage of the mammoth steppe, consisting of the woolly mammoth, woolly rhinoceros, reindeer, saiga, muskox, steppe bison, arctic fox and lemming among others, was spread across vast areas of Northern Eurasia as well as North America, and during periodic cold glacials advanced deep into Europe. Other animals, such as horses, steppe lions, the scimitar cat, the Ice Age spotted hyena, wolves, wild boar, and red deer, were part of both faunal assemblages. Both groups of animals spread and retreated cyclically, depending on whether the climate favoured one or the other, but essentially remained intact in refugia that continued to provide the conditions they preferred.

Prior to the Last Glacial Maximum however, elements of the warm-temperate Palaeoloxodon-fauna (hippopotamus, straight-tusked elephant, the two Stephanorhinus-rhinos species and neanderthals, for example) as well as the steppe species Elasmotherium sibricum started to disappear and eventually went extinct. At the onset of the Last Glacial Maximum, populations of Ice Age spotted hyena and the cave bear complex (Ursus spelaea, Ursus ingressus) seem to have collapsed large-scale, and became extinct next. After the Last Glacial Maximum and towards the Holocene, extinctions continued, with many emblematic "Ice Age species" of the mammoth steppe and adjacent habitats, such as the woolly rhinoceros, the steppe lion, the giant deer and the woolly mammoth falling victim, although small regional populations of woolly mammoth held out well into the Holocene, and the giant deer was present in the southern Ural region into historical times. These extinctions have been variously credited to human impact, climate change, or a combination of the two.

These extinctions were not limited to Europe or the Palearctic, but rather occurred on all continents except for Antarctica, in temporal connection to the migration of Homo sapiens. Together, these extinctions are commonly known as the Quaternary extinction event. Whereas today megafaunal Proboscideans, Rhinocerotidae and Hippopotamidae significantly above  exclusively exist in the global south, notably Sub-Saharan Africa and South and Southeast Asia, land mammals of comparable or greater size used to roam the northern hemisphere and South America until relatively recently. By 10,000 BC, the megafauna of the global north had alternately died out or been severely geographically restricted. Notable examples include the taxa Palaeoloxodon, mammoth, mastodon, Stegodon, Cuvieronius, Notiomastodon, Stephanorhinus, woolly rhinoceros, Elasmotherium, Toxodon, Mixotoxodon, Eremotherium, Megatherium, Glyptodon and all diprotodontids.

Furthermore, other megafauna above , including various species of cervids, bovids, antilocaprids, Meridiungulata, Marsupials, camelids, tayassuids, equids, felids, canids and ursids that were spread across all continents except for Antarctica prior to the Quaternary extinction event, have since declined across their range, or become extinct, respectively. More so, many big mammal species (such as the Eurasian saiga, wapiti-deer, the Asian black bear, the yak, bisons, the dhole, lions, the leopard, the jaguar, and the giant anteater) have since become locally extinct and survive only in fractions of their once-greater distribution. While the exact cause of these events remains debated, it seems clear that ecological niches in Europe, the Middle East, big parts of Asia, and the Americas were left unoccupied.Similar to how big herds of herbivores like wildebeest, zebra, impala, buffalo, and elephants drive African savanna vegetation patterns, and not vice versa (i.e. the vegetation dictates the activities of these herbivores), some pro-Vera scholars argue that pre-Quaternary herds could have provided similar ecosystem functions in the temperate regions.

An illustration of this geographically widespread phenomenon is in Europe, where the only remaining large wild herbivores and omnivores widely distributed across the continent are red deer, fallow deer, roe deer, elk, reindeer, wild boar, beaver and the brown bear, and the largest remaining wild animal is the wisent. On the other hand, the Aurochs, the straight-tusked elephant, two species of Stephanorhinus as well as the hippopotamus, the Irish elk, wild horse and Haploidoceros mediterraneus among many others were lost. Other continents like South America and Australia have witnessed even more drastic changes and lost almost all of their native megafauna. Thus, it is argued that the remaining herbivores do not manage to adequately replace the extinct ones, and, since their extinction is often attributed to human activity, that these extinctions were not natural, i.e. that the modern ecosystems of Europe miss the megafauna's services as ecosystem engineers. Alternatively, it is argued that herbivores have never recovered to pre-Quaternary-extinction numbers in Europe, and that the remaining fauna could have maintained semi-open landscapes if humans had not actively limited their numbers and restricted their ranges.

Ecological processes in grazed ecosystems
There are several ecological processes at work in herbivore grazing systems, namely associational resistance, shifting mosaics, cyclic succession, and gap dynamics. These processes would collectively transform the surrounding landscape, as per Vera's model.

Associational resistance
Generally, the term associational resistance may describe facilitating relationships between plants that grow close to each other, against both biotic and abiotic stresses like browsing, drought, or salinity. In relation to grazed ecosystems, it can allow for the recruitment of trees and other palatable woody species, via thorny nurse bushes, in these environments. It has been proposed and demonstrated that associational resistance can be a key process in grazed environments, ensuring natural succession. The consequent hypothesis is known as the associational resistance and aggregational resistance theory.In temperate Europe, succession on pastures commonly starts with so called "islets" ("Geilstellen"), patches of dung which are avoided by the herbivores for an amount of time after deposition, sufficient to allow the establishment of relatively unpalatable species such as rushes, nettles and hummocks of tall grasses like tussock grass. These swards, in turn, provide protection for thorny shrubs such as blackthorn, roses, hawthorn, juniper, bramble, holly and barberry during their early years, when they do not yet have protective thorns and are therefore vulnerable. Once the thorny saplings are fully established, they grow bigger over time and subsequently allow other, less resilient species to establish in their thorn protection. Species such as yew, buckthorn, alder buckthorn, wayfarer, guelder rose, wild privet, dogwood, cornel, mazzard, checker tree, rowan and whitebeam, which are distributed by fruit-eating birds through their faeces, would frequently be placed within these shrubs, through resting birds leaving their droppings.

On the other hand, nut-bearing species such as hazel, beech, chestnut, pedunculate and sessile oak would become "planted" somewhat deliberately in the vicinity of those shrubs by rodents such as red squirrel and wood mouse, the nuthatch and corvids such as crows, magpies, ravens and especially jays, which store them for winter supply. In Europe, the Eurasian jay represents the most important seed disperser of oak, burying acorns individually or in small groups. Eurasian jays not only bury acorns in depths favoured by oak saplings but seemingly also prefer spots with sufficient light availability, i.e. open grassland and transitions between grassland and shrubland, seeking for vertical structures such as shrubs in the near surroundings. Since oak is relatively light-demanding while not having the ability to regenerate on its own under high browsing pressure, these habits of the jay presumably benefit oak, since they provide the conditions oak requires for optimal growth and health. On a similar note, the nuthatch seems to assume a prominent role for hazel dispersal.

In addition, species such as wild pear, crab apple and sorb tree, which bear relatively large fruit, would find propagators in herbivores such as roe deer, red deer and cattle, or in omnivores such as the wild boar, red fox, the European badger and the raccoon, while wind-dispersed species such as maple, elm, lime or ash would land within these shrubs by chance.

Since many of these species are analogously replaced by either closely related or ecologically similar species across the temperate northern hemisphere, a comparable scheme could probably apply to these regions as well.

It is now generally considered that thorny bushes play an important role in tree regeneration in the European lowlands, and evidence is emerging that similar processes can also ensure the survival of browsing-sensitive species like rowan in browsed boreal forests.

Shifting mosaics and cyclic succession

Starting from an extensively grazed pasture, one could thus figure the natural development of succession, according to the hypothesis, as follows: First unpalatable perennial plants like nettles, thistles, teasels, bracken, heather and restharrows would establish, providing shelter for thorny woody plants like hawthorns, junipers, brooms, roses and sloes. Second, these would start to form thickets avoided by herbivores, thus enabling larger, palatable shrubs and trees respectively to grow in their protection. Over time these would then outshadow the unpalatable but light-demanding thickets and emerge as big solitary trees, in the case of single-standing shrubs like hawthorn, or groups of trees in the case of expanding blackthorn shrubs. Because of the herbivore disturbance (browsing, trampling, wallowing, dust bathing), even shade-tolerant tree saplings would not be able to grow under the established trees, which means that there would virtually be no vegetation beneath them. Finally, the established trees would start to decay, either due to old age or other factors like pathogens, illness, lightning strike or windbreak, eventually leaving open, bare land for grasses and unpalatable species to colonise, thus closing the cycle.

On a large scale, different successional stages would thus contribute an ecosystem where open grassland, scrubland, emerging tree growth, groves of trees and solitary trees exist next to each other, and the alternation between these various successional stages would create dynamic shifting mosaics of vegetation. This in turn stimulates high biodiversity. Consequently, Vera's counter-proposal to the linear succession and Watt's gap-phase model of closed-canopy forest, to which it has been compared is a model of successional cycles known as the shifting mosaics model.

In effect however, not all areas would have necessarily been subject to this permanent change. Since grazing animals generally prefer to spend time in grasslands rather than in closed stands of trees, it would practically be possible for three different landscape types to coexist over longer periods in the same spots: permanently open areas, permanently closed groves and areas subject to constant shifting mosaics.

Implications for environment protection and conservation practice

Historically, environment protection in Europe and around the northern hemisphere, in the temperate, broadleaved regions was often focused on the protection of old forests, since it was perceived that these old-growth forests represent the closest modern analogy to the original European vegetation prior to the likewise assumed clearing of these forests on the advent of agriculture, by humans. More so it was mostly believed, that open and semi-open landscapes like heathland, wood pastures, pastures and in general any kind of landscape apart from more or less dense forest can be solely seen as a substitutional habitat for the original woodland, and that open habitats, if there, in fact, were any, would have been restricted to places uninhabitable for trees. Only in areas too dry, wet, rocky or sandy for trees to colonise, or where vegetation periods were too short to support trees, would these forests be replaced by other vegetation types, most notably steppe ecosystems. The dominating natural virgin vegetation of the broadleaved regions was assumed to be a climax community that over time develops into a steady state dominated by a few shade-tolerant, competitive species such as beech and maple. Although this theory is mostly abandoned in favour of theories that account for dynamic processes in ecosystems, e.g. temporal collapses of forest cover and disturbances through fire, storm or browsing, the prevalent conception of European virgin vegetation is forest primeval. Examples of this include Białowieża on the Polish-Belarusian border as well as the Hainich in Central Germany.The logical consequence of this would have been, and was, that species associated with grasslands, forest fringes and old, open-grown trees disappeared on large scale, since many ecosystems in Europe, including highly species-rich grasslands in Romania, strictly depend on some management and are negatively impacted if the areas are left fallow and overgrown by forest vegetation. Similarly, the displacement of aspen in boreal forests seems to be accelerated more because of increasing competition in the increasingly closed stands than via browsing.

In Europe, grasslands were maintained by large herbivores over the last 1,8 million years. This resulted in extraordinary biodiversity in many European grasslands. For example, on a wooded meadow in Estonia, 76 species of plants per  were counted in 2000, making it one of the world's record sites. However, grasslands in Europe and elsewhere are increasingly under threat, including from forest encroachment following abandonment, ill-conceived forest restoration schemes, overgrazing and agricultural intensification. Especially the notion that most grasslands derive from human management and as such are essentially degraded former woodlands suitable for reforestation has been called into question more recently and is threatening native grassland ecosystems worldwide. For Europe, studies have demonstrated the local persistence of grasslands throughout the Holocene as natural ecosystems, the important role they play for pollinators and the potential for biodiversity enhancement that lies in their maintenance by reintroduced large herbivores. At the same time, up to 90% of European semi-natural grasslands, meaning grasslands that were formerly maintained by humans and their livestock, have disappeared during the 20th century, with losses especially high in Western, Northern and Central Europe.

Given the significant importance oaks have as habitat for wood-eating insect communities in Europe, it has been pointed out that traditional forest management may not deliver all the benefits dead oak wood has for these species, since these often depend on surrounding circumstances such as sun-exposure, and that conservation of highly species-rich plant communities of open oak woodlands may best be achieved through traditional grazing management.

In the traditional framework of closed-canopy forest as the aspired ideal, the losses of species dependent on open areas were seen as collateral damage necessary for the creation of this ideal and had to be accepted because species associated with open areas were seen as hemerophiles anyway, which would have followed human clearings into Central and Western Europe only in the Holocene and would have originally been restricted to Southern and Eastern Europe. Taking into account that this results in overall biodiversity loss, traditional agricultural landscapes were then in turn recognised as important refuges for species-groups associated with open landscapes, seen as either a by-product of post-Neolithic agricultural traditions or relics of Pleistocene assemblages that formed alongside the now-extinct Pleistocene megafauna for which introduced domestic animals were partial substitutes. In both cases, their continued survival would largely depend on the continued execution of traditional agricultural practices. 

Vera's hypothesis implies both that the model of primeval forest and the resulting rhetoric are the result of a major fallacy in nature conservation, paleoecology and forestry, and that the preservation of open and half-open landscapes and their germane biodiversity does not depend on agricultural practices, but rather on the maintenance by large herbivores, whether wild or domesticated.

Rewilding and practical implementation of the hypothesis 

Although the validity of Vera's hypothesis remains debated among ecologists and conservationists, it is often considered a fruitful approach for environment protection and conservation, and thus has been widely implemented in daily practice. The resulting rewilding-advocacy differs from more traditional conservation primarily in that it emphasises a hands-off approach. Instead of intervening to preserve or revive specific species or ecosystem types, the principle is to reduce human intervention to a minimum and instead reintroduce natural ecosystem dynamics, with emphasis being put on returning large mammals to the landscape.

Examples of such projects include the Dutch conservation area Oostvaardersplassen, which was initiated by Vera, as well as the Knepp estate in Sussex. Isabella Tree, co-owner of the latter, has named Vera and his ideas as important reasons for her and her husband to consider rewilding their private estate with fallow deer, red deer, English Longhorn cattle (as ecological proxies for the extinct aurochs) and Tamworth pigs (as proxies for the wild boar).

Furthermore, in the shape of Rewilding Europe, a pan-European organization that aims for creating wild spaces in Europe by re-establishing food chains and reintroducing formally missing species, has identified Vera's proposals as key to complex ecosystems and, taking them into account, works to establish big herds of European bison, aurochs-proxies (e.g. Taurus-cattle), proxies for the wild tarpan (e.g. Konik, Exmoor pony) as well as water buffalo and kulan, which were present in Europe until the early Holocene, to create dynamic ecosystems maintained by the grazing and browsing activity of these herbivores.

Ecology of wood-pastures

Grazed woodlands, wood-pastures and pastures in many regions of the world harbour high biodiversity. Rare perennial plant species commonly or exclusively associated with these ecosystems in Europe include hellebores, peonies, asphodels, dittany, black false hellebore and Melittis melissophyllum. The tree layer is often dominated by a number of oak species and many rare, local and threatened species such as Malus florentina, Malus (Eriolobus) trilobata, medlar, sorb tree, Macedonian oak, Lusitanian oak, pears and wild plums like Prunus cocomila, Prunus webbii, and Prunus cerasifera are more often found in European silvopastoral systems than in commercial forest. Rare or declining bird species such as the European roller, hoopoe, several species of shrike, owls (scops owl, little owl) as well as wrynecks, middle spotted woodpeckers and the Spanish imperial eagle are attracted by wood-pastures in particular, for various reasons, while Iberian lynx depend on dehesas.

Cultural significance

Many aspects of Vera's theory resonate well with traditional pastoral systems and agricultural practices across Europe and other parts of the world. This is especially true for regions where the pasturing of grazing animals has been carried out for hundreds and thousands of years, and phrases such as the old English saying "The thorn is the mother of the oak", referring to the recruitment of oaks inside thorny shrubs, attest to the knowledge about processes such as associational resistance as part of old traditional farming knowledge that was present in rural communities well before the theory itself was proposed in its current form. Furthermore, following Vera's argumentation, wood-pastures and related farming systems as ancient land-use systems could be viewed as essentially mimicking the primaeval European wilderness. This goes hand-in-hand with the fact that for instance 63 of the ecosystems listed in Annex I of the Habitats Directive of the European Union strictly depend on low-intensity use and maintenance work, mostly in the form of grazing and mowing. These habitats are labelled as high nature value farmland (HNV farmland), and the fact that traditional farming, in particular, can potentially harbour exceptional biodiversity values might in part be due to such mimicking effects some forms of human use such as grazing, pollarding, coppicing and hedgelaying might exercise as analogies to ecosystem services formerly exercised by the megafauna.

Sergey Zimov's megaherbivore decline model 

While Vera's hypothesis focuses on temperate regions and especially temperate Europe, an argumentatively related model has more recently been proposed for high latitude regions of modern taiga and tundra biomes, where formerly mammoth steppe predominated. It essentially challenges the widespread view that the Pleistocene megafauna of the northern steppe vanished as a consequence of the warming climate at the advent of the Holocene and the consequent turnover of cold-adapted grassland and herb ecosystems into expanding forests and tundra dominated by mosses, lichens and dwarf trees. Instead, it argues that vice versa the declining megafauna was the precondition for the vegetational turnover, and that healthy megafauna populations could have maintained their preferred environment, the mammoth steppe, even under the stresses of the warming climate if human-induced extinctions had not occurred. Consequently, Sergey Zimov, one of the main supporters of the latter thesis, proposes that ecosystems functionally similar to the mammoth steppe of the Pleistocene could function under modern circumstances as well, and seeks to prove this in the form of Pleistocene park by reintroducing species extinct in Yakutia today, and species that are ecologically similar to those that were present in the region during the Pleistocene but have since become globally extinct, including wild species like reindeer, muskox, bison and wisent, and hardy domestic breeds like Bactrian camels, Kalmyk cattle, domestic yaks and Orenburg goats. With these, the project hopes to revive the mammoth steppe, at least in fractions of its former expanse.

See also
Holocene extinction
Evolutionary anachronism
Breeding back
Pleistocene rewilding
Conservation grazing
Oostvaardersplassen
Knepp wildland
Wood pasture
Breite Oak Tree Reserve
New Forest
Globally Important Agricultural Heritage Systems

Notes

References

Further reading

External links 
 
 Reddit.com: /r/megafaunarewilding/wiki/ & /r/microfaunarewilding
 Tree, Isabella (2018-11-26): We need to bring back the wildwoods of Britain to fight climate change the Guardian.

Ecology
Ecological theories
Rewilding
Agroforestry